Edward Strutt (1853–1911) was a Wesleyan missionary who worked extensively in Sri Lanka in the latter part of the 19th century.

He was principal in 1877-1878 of Jaffna Central College.

References

1853 births
1911 deaths
Methodist missionaries in Sri Lanka
British expatriates in Sri Lanka
People from Mansfield Woodhouse
English Methodist missionaries